Betty Henderson (1907–1979) was a Scottish actress.

Roles included Mrs McDougal in the 1959 version of The 39 Steps.

Filmography

External links 
 

Scottish film actresses
1907 births
1979 deaths
20th-century Scottish actresses